Youth is a 2002 Indian Tamil-language romantic drama film directed by Vincent Selva. It is the Tamil remake of the Telugu film, Chiru Navvutho (2000). It stars Vijay and Sandhya, while Yugendran, Vivek, Manivannan, and Sindhu Menon play other pivotal characters. The film released on 19 July 2002. It received positive reviews and was a commercial hit.

Plot 
On his wedding day, Shiva discovers that his cousin and bride, Aruna, has run away because she does not want to marry a cook. However, he takes it lightly and moves to Chennai with Aruna's brother Prabhu to look for a job. One night, Shiva saves a girl Sandhya from some goons. In gratitude, she kisses him. Shiva starts to fall in love with her. After several occasions where they bump into each other, Shiva harbours hope that she too reciprocates his affections.

However at Sandhya's birthday party, she announces her engagement to computer engineer Pratap. Shiva is devastated at the news and leaves the room quietly. Sandhya finds him standing alone at the swimming pool. She asks him about his impression of Pratap and is shocked when Shiva reveals to her that he loves her. Sandhya declares that she only feels friendship towards him and tells him to stop loving her.

After receiving a telephone call, Shiva goes to the police station and finds Aruna. She had eloped with her to-be lover. However, he later abandoned her and left her penniless. With no one to turn to, Aruna attempted suicide. Shiva takes her back home to take care of her. Prabhu was still angry and calls up their parents. Shiva speaks up for Aruna and gets the family to forgive her. Before returning to the village, Aruna meets Pratap and discovers that Sandhya's fiancé is actually the lover who abandoned her.

On the eve of Sandhya's wedding, she finally understands that she loves Shiva and tells her father that she does not want to marry Pratap. Her father refuses to cancel the wedding and gives Shiva a cheque for 10 million to get the latter to leave Sandhya. Sandhya runs away on her wedding day to look for Shiva and confesses to him that she loves him too. She wants to elope with Shiva, but he brings her back to the wedding venue.

Before the ceremony starts, he calls Pratap into a room and closes the door. When the door reopens, Shiva and Pratap had changed clothes. Shiva is now in the groom's attire, while Pratap is in ordinary clothes. Shiva marries Sandhya in the end. On their wedding night, Shiva reveals to Sandhya what happened between Pratap and him in the room. He offered Sandhya's father's cheque to Pratap in exchange for calling off his engagement, which Pratap accepted. Shiva also reveals that he knew that Sandhya's father would later cancel the cheque, thinking that Shiva is cheating him, which comes to pass.

Cast

Production 
The film is a remake of the 2000 Telugu film Chiru Navvutho starring Venu and Shaheen Khan. The film was also made in Kannada as Premakke Sai in 2001 with Ravichandran and Shaheen. Despite appearing in only four feature films, three of Shaheen's films have featured her reprising the role of Sandhya. "Velu" and "Prince" were considered as titles before naming it as "Youth". Some scenes were shot at Hyderabad where a song too was shot on a lavish set erected, and it had Vijay dancing with about a hundred dancers. Some stunt scenes were later shot at Chennai, at the Vauhini Studios, at the AVM Studios, a lavish set costing a cool 12 lakh, was erected resembling a waterfall, with trees and grass around. A song was shot on the lead pair here. The song "Sagiyea Sagiyea", was shot in Niagara Falls, Toronto and Ottawa in Canada. Director Mysskin worked as an assistant director for this film.

Release 
The film released on 19 July 2002 and became a commercial success. Critics from The Hindu gave the film a positive review, In regard to performances, the critic mentioned that "Vijay is so used to this romantic sojourn that the essay comes without effort", while it was cited that Shaheen Khan's "magical screen presence is definitely missing".

Soundtrack 

The film's soundtrack is composed by Mani Sharma and consists of six songs. Sharma Reused three of the film's song from his previous Telugu films such as Annayya, Chiru Navvutho and Kushi, while the other three are new. The song, "Aal Thotta Bhoopathi Nanada", featured Simran in an item number. The title of the song translates to "I am the king of Aal Garden", referring to the now non-existent Hall's Garden region of Chennai with a spelling mistake.

References

External links 
 

2000s Tamil-language films
2002 comedy films
2002 drama films
2002 films
2002 romantic comedy-drama films
Films scored by Mani Sharma
Films shot in Canada
Films shot in Chennai
Films shot in Hyderabad, India
Indian romantic comedy-drama films
Tamil remakes of Telugu films